Luciana-Andreea Popescu (née Marin; born 13 October 1988) is a Romanian handballer who plays for CS Minaur Baia Mare.

Achievements 
Liga Națională:
Winner: 2014
Finalist: 2015
Cupa României: 
Winner: 2014, 2015
Supercupa României:
Winner: 2013, 2014, 2015

References

 

1988 births
Living people
Sportspeople from Slatina, Romania
Romanian female handball players
CS Minaur Baia Mare (women's handball) players